is a Japanese politician of People's New Party, an independent and member of the House of Councillors in the Diet (national legislature).

Overview 
A native of Toyama, Toyama and 1992 graduate of University of Tsukuba, he was elected for the first time in 2007.

References

External links 
  in Japanese.

1967 births
Living people
People from Toyama (city)
20th-century Japanese physicians
Members of the House of Councillors (Japan)
People's New Party politicians
21st-century Japanese politicians
University of Tsukuba alumni
Sumitomo Life